Fan Chengzuo was a Chinese diplomat. He was Ambassador of the People's Republic of China to Albania (1986–1989).

References

Ambassadors of China to Albania
Possibly living people
Year of birth missing (living people)